Andrzej Żuławski (22 November 1940 – 17 February 2016) was a Polish film director and writer. Żuławski often went against  mainstream commercialism in his films, and enjoyed success mostly with European art-house audiences.

In the late 1950s, he studied cinema in France. His second feature, The Devil (1972), was banned in communist Poland, and Żuławski went to France. After the success of That Most Important Thing: Love in 1975, he returned to Poland where he spent two years making On the Silver Globe (not released until 1988). The work on this film was interrupted and destroyed by the authorities. After that, Żuławski moved to France where he became known for controversial and violent art-house films such as Possession (1981). Żuławski is also known for his work with actresses including Romy Schneider, Isabelle Adjani and Sophie Marceau.

His films have received awards at various international film festivals. Żuławski had also written several novels, for example: Il était Un Verger, Lity Bór (a.k.a. La Forêt Forteresse), W Oczach Tygrysa, and Ogród Miłości.

Biography 
Żuławski was born in Lviv, Ukrainian SSR (formerly known as Lwów). He was an assistant of the filmmaker Andrzej Wajda.

When his second film The Devil was banned in Poland, he decided to move to France, where he made That Most Important Thing: Love (1975) with Romy Schneider.

After returning to Poland he worked for two years on a film which the authorities did not allow him to finish (On the Silver Globe), based on a book by his great-uncle Jerzy Żuławski. Since then he lived and worked mostly in France, making art films.

Being a maverick who always defied mainstream commercialism, Żuławski enjoyed success mostly with the European art-house audiences. His wild, imaginative, and controversial pictures have received awards at various international film festivals. He also wrote the novels Il était Un Verger, Lity Bór (a.k.a. La Forêt Forteresse), W Oczach Tygrysa, and Ogród Miłości.

In 2006 he was the Head of the Jury at the 28th Moscow International Film Festival.

Żuławski worked many times with composer Andrzej Korzyński, beginning in The Third Part of the Night (1971). Their last collaboration was for Cosmos (2015), which was also Żuławski's last film.

On 17 February 2016, Żuławski died at a hospital in Warsaw from cancer.

Personal life 

He had three sons from different relationships. Żuławski's ex-wife was Małgorzata Braunek, who was a Polish film and stage actress. Their son, Xawery, is also a film director.

He was in a relationship with the French actress Sophie Marceau for sixteen years, with whom he made four films over a 15-year period (L'Amour braque, My Nights Are More Beautiful Than Your Days, La Note bleue, Fidelity). They had a son Vincent together. They broke up in 2001.

2007-2008 Żuławski had been dating Weronika Rosati. In 2010 Żuławski released a book titled "Nocnik", which included a character allegedly based on Rosati named Esther. Rosati sued Żuławski and the book's publisher for violating her right to privacy and dignity as a woman as the book included intimate details about her. Żuławski lost the case in 2015.

Filmography

Feature films

Short films and television

References

External links 

 
 Andrzej Żuławski at Culture.pl
 Andrzej Żuławski, 1940–2016 at Sight & Sound
Jérôme d'Estais, Possession, Tentatives d'exorcisme, Editions Rouge profond, 2019
Jérome d'Estais, Andrzej Zulawski, sur le fil, LettMotif [archive], 2015 ( and )

1940 births
2016 deaths
Commandeurs of the Ordre des Arts et des Lettres
Commanders with Star of the Order of Polonia Restituta
Deaths from cancer in Poland
Film people from Lviv
Polish expatriates in Russia
Polish expatriates in France
Polish film directors
French film directors
Polish people of Ukrainian descent
Polish screenwriters
Polish anti-communists